2010 Associates Twenty20 Series in Kenya was a tournament of Twenty20 cricket matches that were held in Kenya from 30 January to 4 February 2010. The three participating teams were Kenya, Scotland and Uganda. The matches were played at the Gymkhana Club Ground in Nairobi. Kenya won the series, after winning all four of their round robin matches.

Squads

Points table

Matches

1st match

2nd match

3rd match

4th match

5th match

6th match

References

International cricket competitions in 2010
2010
Kenyan cricket seasons from 2000–01
2010 in Kenyan cricket
January 2010 sports events in Africa
February 2010 sports events in Africa